La Romaine (literally The Romaine) is a commune in the Haute-Saône department of eastern France. The municipality was established on 1 January 2016 and consists of the former communes of Le Pont-de-Planches, Greucourt and Vezet.

See also 
Communes of the Haute-Saône department

References 

Communes of Haute-Saône
Populated places established in 2016